Standards Norway (SN) is the main standards organization of Norway. It claims responsibility for all standardization areas except for electrotechnical and telecommunication issues. Standards Norway holds the right to the trademark Norwegian Standard (abbreviated NS) and represents the country of Norway in The European Committee for Standardization (CEN) and the International Organization for Standardization (ISO). Its headquarters are located at the Lilleaker neighborhood in the western part of Oslo.

References

External links 
Official website

Norway
Organisations based in Oslo
Organizations established in 1923
Standards organisations in Norway